St. Thomas Aquinas Catholic High School was a coeducational college preparatory Roman Catholic school located at 131 Judge Sablan Street in Ordot, Guam, a United States territory in the Western Pacific Ocean.

The school opened in the Fall of 2008, and was the newest Catholic High School on Guam, under the Archdiocese of Agana.

In 2015 the archdiocese decided that as the school did not have enough students, it should be closed.

References 

Catholic secondary schools in Guam
Educational institutions established in 2008
2008 establishments in Guam
Educational institutions disestablished in 2015
2015 disestablishments in the United States
Defunct Catholic secondary schools in the United States